Helmetta is a borough in Middlesex County, New Jersey, United States. The borough is nestled within the heart of the Raritan Valley region, with Manalapan Brook (a Raritan River tributary) flowing through the center of the community. As of the 2020 United States census, the borough's population was 2,455, its highest decennial count ever and an increase of 277 (+12.7%) from the 2,178 enumerated at the 2010 census, which in turn had reflected an increase of 353 (+19.3%) from the 1,825 counted at the 2000 census. The community was established around a snuff mill opened in the 1820s that was acquired by George Washington Helme in the 1880s.

Helmetta was formed as a borough by an act of the New Jersey Legislature on March 20, 1888, when it was created from portions of East Brunswick, based on the results of a referendum held on March 10, 1888. Helmetta's boundary with East Brunswick Township was changed as of March 24, 1897. The borough was named for Helme's daughter, Olivia Antoinette "Etta" Helme.

History

G. W. Helme Snuff Mill District

Helmetta's main landmark is the large, abandoned Helme Products Inc. plant that sits adjacent to the Camden and Amboy Railroad line running through the borough. The mill began producing snuff in the 1880s. On February 23, 1900, the mill was bought by the American-Sniff Company in a merger with Helme Products Inc., but the merger was dissolved in 1911.  In 1925, the mill became the largest of its kind in the world, and by 1934 it employed 400 people.  In 1986, the mill was bought out by American Maize-Products.  Finally, in 1993, it was purchased by Swisher International, and operations were moved to Wheeling, West Virginia.  It has remained inactive since.

The G. W. Helme Snuff Mill District is a classic example of a late 1800s mill town. The district consists of the George Washington Helme snuff mill, housing for employees, accessory buildings, St. George's Episcopal Church, Holy Trinity Roman Catholic Church, and Helmetta Pond, which at one time served as a source of power for the mill.  About 115 buildings were originally in the district, which was named to the New Jersey Register of Historic Places on February 1, 1980, and to the National Register of Historic Places listings in Middlesex County, New Jersey on August 15, 1980.

Geography
According to the United States Census Bureau, the borough had a total area of 0.88 square miles (2.27 km2), including 0.83 square miles (2.15 km2) of land and 0.05 square miles (0.13 km2) of water (5.57%).

The borough borders the Middlesex County municipalities of East Brunswick, Monroe Township and Spotswood.

Demographics

Census 2010

The Census Bureau's 2006–2010 American Community Survey showed that (in 2010 inflation-adjusted dollars) median household income was $80,690 (with a margin of error of +/− $4,944) and the median family income was $96,875 (+/− $8,073). Males had a median income of $63,625 (+/− $7,838) versus $48,333 (+/− $6,040) for females. The per capita income for the borough was $36,941 (+/− $2,537). About 3.4% of families and 3.7% of the population were below the poverty line, including 5.8% of those under age 18 and 3.2% of those age 65 or over.

Census 2000

As of the 2000 United States Census there were 1,825 people, 746 households, and 495 families residing in the borough. The population density was 2,153.6 people per square mile (829.0/km2). There were 769 housing units at an average density of 907.5 per square mile (349.3/km2). The racial makeup of the borough was 93.15% White, 2.41% African American, 0.22% Native American, 2.41% Asian, 0.05% Pacific Islander, 0.88% from other races, and 0.88% from two or more races. Hispanic or Latino of any race were 5.32% of the population.

There were 746 households, out of which 33.0% had children under the age of 18 living with them, 54.7% were married couples living together, 8.4% had a female householder with no husband present, and 33.6% were non-families. 25.6% of all households were made up of individuals, and 5.1% had someone living alone who was 65 years of age or older. The average household size was 2.45 and the average family size was 3.01.

In the borough the population was spread out, with 22.1% under the age of 18, 6.5% from 18 to 24, 44.1% from 25 to 44, 21.2% from 45 to 64, and 6.2% who were 65 years of age or older. The median age was 36 years. For every 100 females, there were 98.4 males. For every 100 females age 18 and over, there were 97.2 males.

The median income for a household in the borough was $60,125, and the median income for a family was $64,659. Males had a median income of $47,604 versus $33,929 for females. The per capita income for the borough was $26,668. About 3.2% of families and 3.3% of the population were below the poverty line, including 5.2% of those under age 18 and 1.8% of those age 65 or over.

Government

Local government
Helmetta is governed under the Borough form of New Jersey municipal government, which is used in 218 municipalities (of the 564) statewide, making it the most common form of government in New Jersey. The governing body is comprised of the Mayor and the Borough Council, with all positions elected at-large on a partisan basis as part of the November general election. The Mayor is elected directly by the voters to a four-year term of office. The Borough Council has six members elected to serve three-year terms on a staggered basis, with two seats coming up for election each year in a three-year cycle. The Borough form of government used by Helmetta is a "weak mayor / strong council" government in which council members act as the legislative body with the mayor presiding at meetings and voting only in the event of a tie. The mayor can veto ordinances subject to an override by a two-thirds majority vote of the council. The mayor makes committee and liaison assignments for council members, and most appointments are made by the mayor with the advice and consent of the council.

, the Mayor of Helmetta Borough is Independent Christopher Slavicek, whose term of office ends December 31, 2023. Members of the Helmetta Borough Council are Council President Joseph W. Reid (I, 2022), Michael R. Duffy (R, 2024), Ronald Dzingleski (I, 2022), Peter J. Karczewski (R, 2024), Samuel Mena (2023; appointed to serve an unexpired term) and Nicholas Stasi (2023; appointed to serve an unexpired term).

Samuel Mena was appointed in September 2021 to fill the seat expiring in December 2023 that had been held by Noreen Carolan-Genthe and Nicholas Stasi was appointed in October 2021  to fill the seat formerly held by Joseph Perez and also expiring in December 2021. Both Mena and Stasi will serve on an interim basis until the November 2021 general election when voters will select candidates to serve the balance of the terms of office.

In January 2016, Ronald Dzingleski and Joseph Reid were appointed to fill two of the three vacant council seats.

In April 2016, the Borough Council selected Noreen Carolan to fill the term expiring in December 2016 that had been held temporarily by Brian Hackett who had in turn been appointed to fill the seat held by Yvette Bruno.

In 2014, a recording of a police officer telling a cameraperson stating that he has the constitutional right to take video that he doesn't "give a damn" about constitutional rights was made public. In response, the city government proposed an ordinance banning video and photography inside public buildings without a permit.

In April 2018, Helmetta disbanded its three-officer police force and entered into a six-year shared services agreement with Spotswood to provide police, dispatch and EMS services to Helmetta residents. The Spotswood Police Department is a 24/7 law enforcement agency that serves both Spotswood and Helmetta. The department has 22 officers, 3 full-time dispatchers, and 4 part-time dispatchers, led by Chief Michael Zarro.

In 2018, the borough had an average property tax bill of $6,270, the lowest in the county, compared to an average bill of $8,092 in Middlesex County and $8,767 statewide.

Federal, state and county representation
Helmetta is located in the 12th Congressional District and is part of New Jersey's 18th state legislative district.

 

Middlesex County is governed by a Board of County Commissioners, whose seven members are elected at-large on a partisan basis to serve three-year terms of office on a staggered basis, with either two or three seats coming up for election each year as part of the November general election. At an annual reorganization meeting held in January, the board selects from among its members a commissioner director and deputy director. , Middlesex County's Commissioners (with party affiliation, term-end year, and residence listed in parentheses) are 
Commissioner Director Ronald G. Rios (D, Carteret, term as commissioner ends December 31, 2024; term as commissioner director ends 2022),
Commissioner Deputy Director Shanti Narra (D, North Brunswick, term as commissioner ends 2024; term as deputy director ends 2022),
Claribel A. "Clary" Azcona-Barber (D, New Brunswick, 2022),
Charles Kenny (D, Woodbridge Township, 2022),
Leslie Koppel (D, Monroe Township, 2023),
Chanelle Scott McCullum (D, Piscataway, 2024) and 
Charles E. Tomaro (D, Edison, 2023).
Constitutional officers are
County Clerk Nancy Pinkin (D, 2025, East Brunswick),
Sheriff Mildred S. Scott (D, 2022, Piscataway) and 
Surrogate Claribel Cortes (D, 2026; North Brunswick).

Politics
As of March 23, 2011, there were a total of 1,399 registered voters in Helmetta, of which 403 (28.8%) were registered as Democrats, 264 (18.9%) were registered as Republicans and 731 (52.3%) were registered as Unaffiliated. There was one voter registered to another party.

In the 2012 presidential election, Democrat Barack Obama received 50.4% of the vote (463 cast), ahead of Republican Mitt Romney with 48.1% (442 votes), and other candidates with 1.4% (13 votes), among the 925 ballots cast by the borough's 1,372 registered voters (7 ballots were spoiled), for a turnout of 67.4%. In the 2008 presidential election, Republican John McCain received 52.1% of the vote (557 cast), ahead of Democrat Barack Obama with 44.9% (480 votes) and other candidates with 2.0% (21 votes), among the 1,069 ballots cast by the borough's 1,438 registered voters, for a turnout of 74.3%. In the 2004 presidential election, Republican George W. Bush received 56.2% of the vote (587 ballots cast), outpolling Democrat John Kerry with 42.3% (442 votes) and other candidates with 0.6% (8 votes), among the 1,044 ballots cast by the borough's 1,382 registered voters, for a turnout percentage of 75.5.

In the 2013 gubernatorial election, Republican Chris Christie received 71.7% of the vote (503 cast), ahead of Democrat Barbara Buono with 26.1% (183 votes), and other candidates with 2.3% (16 votes), among the 718 ballots cast by the borough's 1,374 registered voters (16 ballots were spoiled), for a turnout of 52.3%. In the 2009 gubernatorial election, Republican Chris Christie received 67.5% of the vote (476 ballots cast), ahead of Democrat Jon Corzine with 25.4% (179 votes), Independent Chris Daggett with 4.4% (31 votes) and other candidates with 2.0% (14 votes), among the 705 ballots cast by the borough's 1,402 registered voters, yielding a 50.3% turnout.

Education

All public school students from Helmetta attend the Spotswood Public Schools, with the districts having been consolidated after a July 2009 decision by the New Jersey Department of Education that merged Helmetta into the Spotswood district. Students from Milltown attend the high school as part of a sending/receiving relationship with the Milltown Public Schools.

The Spotswood Public Schools serve students in pre-kindergarten through twelfth grade. As of the 2020–2021 school year, the district, comprised of four schools, had an enrollment of 1,610 students and 136.5 classroom teachers (on an FTE basis), for a student–teacher ratio of 11.8:1. Schools in the district (with 2020–2021 enrollment data from the National Center for Education Statistics) are 
G. Austin Schoenly Elementary School with 207 students in grades Pre-K–1), 
E. Raymond Appleby Elementary School with 334 students in grades 2–5, 
Spotswood Memorial Middle School with 349 students in grades 6–8 and 
Spotswood High School with 692 students in grades 9–12.

Eighth grade students from all of Middlesex County are eligible to apply to attend the high school programs offered by the Middlesex County Vocational and Technical Schools, a county-wide vocational school district that offers full-time career and technical education at Middlesex County Academy in Edison, the Academy for Allied Health and Biomedical Sciences in Woodbridge Township and at its East Brunswick, Perth Amboy and Piscataway technical high schools, with no tuition charged to students for attendance.

Transportation

Roads and highways

The major thoroughfare in the borough is Main Street (County Route 615) which connects with Monroe to the southwest and Spotswood to the northeast. Main Street is largely known as Bordentown-Amboy Turnpike between Jamesburg and South Amboy.

The New Jersey Turnpike (Interstate 95) is accessible at Exit 8A in neighboring Monroe Township.

An analysis of speeding tickets issued over an 18-month period between 2011 and 2013 showed that 222 tickets were issued in that timeframe with only two given to borough residents, which was cited as supporting claims that the borough's police department is unfairly targeting non-residents.

Public transportation
Middlesex County Area Transit (MCAT) shuttles provide service to and from Helmetta on routes operating across the county. The M2 Route connects Jamesburg, Helmetta and Spotswood with East Brunswick including the Brunswick Square Mall.

References

External links

 Official Website
 Spotswood Public Schools
 
 School Data for the Spotswood Public Schools, National Center for Education Statistics
 Helmetta Historical Society

 
1888 establishments in New Jersey
Borough form of New Jersey government
Boroughs in Middlesex County, New Jersey
Historic districts on the National Register of Historic Places in New Jersey
National Register of Historic Places in Middlesex County, New Jersey
New Jersey District Factor Group none
Populated places established in 1888
Tourist attractions in Middlesex County, New Jersey
New Jersey Register of Historic Places